The Basalt Headlands are a chain of intermittent high-cliffed bluffs and islands that fringe the northern edge of the Minas Basin, Nova Scotia, Canada. Its name comes from the basaltic outcrops that formed about 200 million years ago when this region was volcanically active by continental rifting.

See also
Volcanism of Canada
Volcanism of Eastern Canada

References

Headlands of Nova Scotia
Volcanism of Nova Scotia